Wollogorang is a locality in the Upper Lachlan Shire and Goulburn Mulwaree Council, New South Wales, Australia. A small part of the locality is in Queanbeyan–Palerang Regional Council. It is located about 35 km southwest of Goulburn and 61 km northeast of Canberra. It lies on both sides of the Federal Highway and on the southern side of the Hume Highway. They intersect nearby to the northeast in the locality of Yarra.

A significant natural feature of the locality is the Wollogorang Lagoon. Wollogorang Road and Thornford Road are other roads in the area.

History
The Wologorong area was first inhabited by the Gundungurra people and by the mid 1840s the NSW colonial government had granted numerous land grants in the area, beginning white settlement.

Wologorong homestead was the centre of a major pastoral property that was established in the 19th century. The socialite Sheila Chisholm, who was a friend of George VI and Edward VIII was born and brought up there.

References

Localities in New South Wales
Southern Tablelands
Upper Lachlan Shire
Goulburn Mulwaree Council